Švyturio Arena (English: Lighthouse Arena) is an indoor arena in Klaipėda, Lithuania. The arena is named after the company Švyturys, which bought the rights for the name. The capacity of the catamaran-shaped arena is 6,200 seats for basketball games, 4,416 for ice hockey games, 6,512 for boxing/wrestling matches, and 7,450 seats for concerts.

History
Klaipėda Arena held Group D matches of the 37th FIBA European Basketball Championship, from 31 August, to 5 September 2011.

Klaipėda Arena will host some matches for the 2021 FIFA Futsal World Cup.

See also
 List of indoor arenas in Lithuania

External links
 
 Construction progress

Indoor arenas in Lithuania
Buildings and structures in Klaipėda
Basketball venues in Lithuania
FIBA EuroBasket 2011
Indoor ice hockey venues in Lithuania
Sport in Klaipėda
BC Neptūnas
2021 FIFA Futsal World Cup venues